Arif Masih Bhatti is a Pakistani politician who had been a Member of the Provincial Assembly of Sindh, from June 2013 to May 2018.

Early life 
He was born on 11 April 1970 in Sialkot.

Political career
He was elected to the Provincial Assembly of Sindh as a candidate of Muttahida Qaumi Movement (MQM) on reserved seat for minorities in 2013 Pakistani general election.

In June 2017, he quit MQM to join Pakistan Peoples Party.

References

Living people
Sindh MPAs 2013–2018
1970 births